Four ships of the Royal Navy have borne the name HMS Cardiff, after the Welsh capital city, Cardiff:

  was a 34-gun ship, previously the Dutch ship Fortune.
  was a  light cruiser launched in 1917 and broken up in 1946.
  was a Type 42 (Batch 1) destroyer launched in 1974.  She was involved in the Falklands and Gulf Wars and participated in the buildup to the 2003 invasion of Iraq. She was decommissioned in 2005, and sold for scrap.
 HMS Cardiff will be a Type 26 frigate.

The ships' motto is "Agris in cardine rerum" which translates as "Keen in emergency".

Battle honours
Falkland Islands 1982
Kuwait 1991

Royal Navy ship names